Minnesota State Highway 217 (MN 217) is a  highway in northern Minnesota, which runs from its intersection with State Highway 65 at Littlefork and continues east to its eastern terminus at its intersection with U.S. Highway 53 at Ray. MN 217 passes through the city of Littlefork.

Route description
Highway 217 serves as an east–west route between Littlefork and Ray near International Falls.

The route is also known as Main Street in Littlefork.

Highway 217 crosses the Little Fork River and the Rat Root River throughout its route.

The western terminus for Highway 217 is its intersection with State Highway 65 in Littlefork, 8 blocks from U.S. Highway 71.

History
Highway 217 was authorized on July 1, 1949.

The route was paved before 1960.

Major intersections

References

217
Transportation in Koochiching County, Minnesota